is a railway station Aoi-ku, Shizuoka, Japan, operated by the Ōigawa Railway.

Lines

Station layout
The station has a wedge-shaped island platform for two tracks. There is also a small station building.

Adjacent stations

|-
!colspan=5|Ōigawa Railway

Station history
Ikawa Station was opened on August 1, 1959.

Passenger statistics
In fiscal 2017, the station was used by an average of 118 passengers daily (boarding passengers only).

Surrounding area
Ikawa Dam
Ikawa District Community Bus
For Shirakaba-so
For Yokosawa
This route bus had been originally operated by Shizuoka Railway until 2009. Now, at the last stop Yokosawa, it enables to transfer onto the Shizutetsu Just Line route bus Abe Line No.119 travels to Shin-Shizuoka Station.

See also
 List of Railway Stations in Japan

References

External links

 Ōigawa Railway home page

Railway stations in Shizuoka Prefecture
Railway stations in Japan opened in 1959
Railway stations in Shizuoka (city)
Stations of Ōigawa Railway